The Test Handicap was an American Thoroughbred horse race first run on July 25, 1896 at Brighton Beach Race Course in Brighton Beach, Brooklyn, New York where it continued annually through 1909. A race for horses age three and older, it was run on dirt over a distance of one mile.

On June 11, 1908, the Republican controlled New York Legislature under Governor Charles Evans Hughes passed the Hart–Agnew anti-wagering bill. The owners of Brighton Beach Race Course and other racing facilities in New York State struggled to stay in business without wagering revenue. Racetrack owners had no choice but to drastically reduce the purse money being paid out which saw important stakes worth as little as twenty-five percent of what they were just two years earlier. Although the Test Handicap had been scheduled for July 23, 1908, all stakes races were canceled at Brighton Beach Race Course and put on hiatus.

There was no Test Handicap in 1908 and 1909  but the following year Empire City Race Track took over the race dates belonging to the Bright  Beach Race Course and in 1910 hosted the Test Handicap. The race was won by Everett, a three-year-old colt owned by James Francis Johnson's Quincy Stable. However, further restrictive legislation was passed by the New York Legislature in 1910 which resulted in the deepening of the financial crisis for track operators and led to a complete shut down of racing across the state during 1911 and 1912. When a Court ruling saw racing return in 1913 it was too late for the Brighton Beach facility and it never reopened.

Records
Speed record: (at 1 mile)
1:38.00 – Voter (1900) (New World Record).
1:38.00 – Hermis (1904)

Most wins by a jockey:
 2 – Danny Maher (1898, 1899)

Most wins by a trainer:
 3 – Thomas Welsh (1897, 1901, 1903)

Most wins by an owner:
 2 – Julius Fleischmann (1897, 1903)
 2 – James R. Keene (1900, 1905)

Winners

References

Recurring sporting events established in 1896
Recurring sporting events disestablished in 1910
1896 establishments in New York City
1910 disestablishments in New York (state)
Discontinued horse races in New York City
Open mile category horse races
Brighton Beach Race Course
Yonkers Raceway